Page Coal and Coke Company Store is a historic company store building located at Pageton, McDowell County, West Virginia.  It is a two-story brick building on a tall, skillfully-constructed stone foundation.  It was designed in 1914 by architect Alex B. Mahood, and is in the Classical Revival style.

It was listed on the National Register of Historic Places in 1992.

References

Alex B. Mahood buildings
Neoclassical architecture in West Virginia
Commercial buildings on the National Register of Historic Places in West Virginia
National Register of Historic Places in McDowell County, West Virginia
Company stores in the United States
Coal mining in Appalachia